Mario Donizetti (23 January 1932) is an Italian painter and essayist from Bergamo, Lombardy.

Biography
Scientific technical researches have led Donizetti to use innovative techniques for his works such as varnished and glazed egg-yolk tempera as well as his personal encausto and his "encaustic pastel".

In 1977 Donizetti founded the Centre for Research Techniques of Arts and in 2003 the "Donizetti School-Museum" online. Donizetti also contributes to newspapers and magazines with essays on aesthetics and diagnosis of restoration.

In 1983 an anthological exhibition of his work was held in the halls of the Biblioteca Ambrosiana in Milan.

Works
Donizetti's notable works include the "Crucifix" in The Treasury Museum of the Vatican Basilica; the frescos and the altar piece in the historical Basilica in Pontida; the portrait of Pope John Paul II (now part of the National Portrait Gallery (United States) collection in Washington, D.C.) and published on the covers of Time (magazine); "Commedia dell’Arte" in the "Spajani Raccolta" GAMEC in Bergamo; and "La Carità" in the "Margherita Cassis Faraone Collection".

Exhibitions
"Premio Suzzara" 1951 and 1952
"Mostra Arte Sacra" 1952
"Premio Michetti" 1953
"Nazionale Arte Sacra-Bologna" 1954
One man show – Galleria Ranzini – via Brera Milano 1955
"II Quadriennale di Roma" 1955
"Biennale Arte Sacra Angelicum" 1957
One Man Show – Galleria Ranzini – via Brera Milano 1958
"Biennale Angelicum" 1959
One Man Show - La Bussola, Genova 1960
"The Picture and the Painter" Trafalgar Galleries London 1960
"Biennale Arte Sacra Angelicum" 1961
"Museo della Scienza e della Tecnica" 1962
"Museo Teatrale alla Scala" 1963
"Palazzo della Permanente" Milano 1964
"Palazzo Reale" Milano 1966
"The Royal Academy Summer Exhibition" London 1966
"Palazzo della Permanente" 1967
"Padiglione d'Arte Contemporanea" Milano 1969
One Man Show Galleria Quaglino Torino 1970
One Man Show Galleria Pirra Torino 1973
One Man Show J.H.Bauer Galerie Hannover 1974
One Man Show Leitheimer Schloss Museum Mùnchen 1974
"Anthological Exhibition" Ambrosiana Museum 1983-84
"Museo del Patriarcato" Aquileia 1995
"Palazzo Sormani" Milano 1995
"The Seven Deadly Seens" Palazzo della Ragione BG 1999
"Raccolta Spajani" GAMEC BG 1999
"75° TIME Smithsonian Institution" Washington 2000
"75° TIME National Academic Museum" New York 2000
One man show Galleria Schreiber Brescia 2000
One man show Galleria Arsmedia Bergamo 2002
"Quadrato per la Ricerca" GAMEC BG 2005
"Donizetti Designer" Galleria Arsmedia 2003
One man show Galleria Cappelletti – via Brera Milano 2007
One man show Radici-Casa Bergamo 2008
Mostra personale dal 9 aprile al 30 giugno 2011 – CASTELLO di ORZINUOVI
54° BIENNALE – 2011 – ARSENALE VENEZIA
MOSTRA PALAZZO GRIMANI – VITTORIO SGARBI: "l'ombra del sacro nell'arte contemporanea" – VENEZIA 2011

Essays
"Form and no Form" 1958 Ranzini
"Why Figurative" 1992 Corponove Ed.
"Rationality of Faith and of Beauty" 1995 Corponove Ed.
"Letter to Pemenides" 1996 Corponove Ed.
"Letter to Plato" 1997 Corponove Ed.
"Why Figurative" 1997 II° Edition ART’E’
"Aesthetic Arguments" 1999 Corponove Ed.
"Letter to Hegel" 2000 Corponove Ed.
"Lessons on Art Technique" 2005 Corponove Ed.
"Bocconi d’Arte" 2006 ESI Edizioni Scientifiche Italiane
"Letter to Phyllis" 2007 Corponove Ed.
"IL SACRO DELL'ARTE – LETTERA AGLI ARTISTI" – ED. CORPONOVE 2011 
"QUESTO RAFFAELLO NON SI DEVE RESTAURARE" – ECO DI BERGAMO 2O LUGLIO 2012
"DIPINTO NON RITOCCATO LA SUA VERNICE E'AUTENTICA" – CORRIERE DELLA SERA 8 giugno 2013
"L'ILLUSIONE DI KANT E IL RITORNO AI VALORI DEI SENSI" – CORRIERE DELLA SERA 16 gennaio 2014

Mario Donizetti in museums
NATIONAL PORTRAIT GALLERY – SMITHSONIAN INSTITUTION – WASHINGTON
MUSEO TESORO BASILICA SAN PIETRO IN VATICANO
MUSEO STORICA BASILICA PONTIDA
CIVICO MUSEO DI UDINE
MUSEO TEATRALE ALLA SCALA MILANO
GAMEC – GALLERIA DI ARTE MODERNA E CONTEMPORANEA BERGAMO

Bibliography
Piva "Manuale" HOEPLI 1950
V.Costantini "Corriere Lombardo" 1952
Carlo Melis "Settimo Giorno" 1955
Gian Paolo "Domenica del Corriere" 1957
Dino Villani "Gazzetta di Mantova" 1959
Marziano Bernardi "La Stampa" Turin 1960
John McKenzie "Art News and Review" London 1960
Carlo Visconti "Settimo Giorno" 1963
"Monografia" Edizioni Bolis 1967
"Incontri d’arte" Edizioni Quaglino 1970
E.Fabiani "Dipinti e Disegni" Ed. Il Conventino 1972
Enciclopedia Internazionale – Curcio Groellier Roma 1972
A.F. von Tucher Ed. Leitheimer Schloss Galerie Munchen 1974
"Mario Donizetti" Ed. Jehn Heiner Bauer Hannover 1974
"Altmeisterlisches im Tempera" Hannoversche Allgemeine 1974
"Die Klassische Ordnung" Neue Hannoversche Presse 1974
Renzo Biasion OGGI n.14 1976
"Dictionary of International Biography" Cambridge 1976
C.M.Pensa EPOCA 1977
Rossana Bossaglia "Fiori e Animali" Ed. Grafica e Arte 1981
Alessio Andreucci "Visioni". Ed. Vannini 1981
"Ritratto di Diana Spencer" Time (magazine) (cover) New York 1981
"International Who’s Who of Intellectuals" Cambridge 1982
"Marquis Who’s Who in the World" Illinois USA 1982-83
A.Paredi "Donizetti all’Ambrosiana" Ed. FONTES AMBROSIANI 1983
J.Louis Ferrier Le Point Paris 1983
"Ritratto di Indira Gandhi" Time (magazine) (cover) New York 1984
Przekroy-Krakowskie n.2016 Varsavia 1984
"The International Who’s Who" England 1984
Jean Louis Ferrier "La petit form" Ed. Denoel Paris 1985
"Ritratto di papa Giovanni Paolo II" Time (magazine) (cover) 1985
"Marquis Who’s Who in the World" Illinois USA 1986/7
"Biography International" New Delhi India 1987/8
Nicoletta Cobolli- Gigli ARTE 1988
J.L.Ferrier R.De Grada "Monografia" Ed. Bolis 1989
Vittorio Feltri Corriere della Sera 1989
Monika von Zitzewitz DIE WELT 1989
Alessandra Quattordio ARTE 1990
M.Pizzorni "Collection Works by the Great Masters Salvador Dalì, Pietro Annigoni, Mario Donizetti" 1991
Elsa Klensch "Donizetti" Style CNN International New York 1992
Costanza Andreucci "L’Arte fra il Caso e la Tecnica" L’Indipendente 1993
Paolo Levi Bell’Italia n.18 aprile 1993
Michele Andreucci "La rivoluzione del pastello" IL GIORNO 18 nov. 1994
"Dossier Ritratti" Il VENERDI’ di Repubblica 1994
Francesca Bonazzoli ViviMilano del Corriere della Sera 27 dic.1995
Jean Louis Ferrier - S. Milesi – Monografia SILVANA EDITORIALE 1996
"EUROPE 50-Golden Anniversari Issue" Time (magazine) winter 1996
R.Farina "La verità dei sensi" Il Giornale 24 luglio 1996
Francesca Pini SETTE del Corriere della Sera n.46 nov.1996
R.mo Capitolo di san Pietro in Vaticano: Il Crocifisso di Mario Donizetti nel MUSEO TESORO della Basilica – Roma 1996
Ritratto di Den Xiaoping Time (magazine) (cover) 3 marzo 1997
Lorenzo Vincenti OGGI 1997
Ermanno Krumm Corriere della Sera 3 dic. 1997
F.S.Voss – "FACES of TIME, 75 years of Time (magazine) cover portraits" - Brown & company Boston New York Toronto London 1998
"ART and History" TIME 75° Anniversary New York 1998
NEUE KRONEN ZEITUNG "Der Gekreuzigte von Mario Donizetti" (cover) – Wien, Salzburg, Insbruch, Linz, Gratz, Klagenfurt 1998
S. Milesi - Vittorino Andreoli "I Vizi Capitali" Corponove Ed. 1998
Vittorio Fagone "Raccolta SPAJANI" Ed. Lubrina 1999
Flaminio Guardoni CORRIERE della SERA sett. 1999
Vittorio Sgarbi OGGI sett. 1999
RAI 3 TG3 18 sett. 1999
Armando Besio LA REPUBBLICA 13 ott. 1999
Diana De Feo RAI 1 TG1 26 ott. 1999
Time (magazine) "Fascicolo del millennio", dicembre 1999
"L’Arte tornerà Arte" (I grandi avvenimenti del 900, fascicolo n. 9)
Corriere della Sera 2 febbraio 2000
Mauro Gaffurri "L’Arcimboldo" RAI 3 TV Sette del Corriere della Sera 2 giugno 2001
Pia Capelli LIBERO 2 marzo 2002
Cesare Zapperi Corriere della Sera 17 marzo 2002
Vittorio Sgarbi OGGI 20 marzo 2002
Carlo Castellaneta DIZIONARIO della PITTURA ITALIANA 7 genn.2003
Phyllis Tickle GREED - OXFORD UNIVERSITY PRESS March 2003
"Marquis Who’s Who in the World" Illinois USA 2003
ENCICLOPEDIA RIZZOLI LAROUSSE 2003
F. Pini "Eva. The Passion secondo Donizetti" MAGAZINE Corriere della Sera n. 4 del 3 giugno 2004
"Marquis Who’sWho in the World" Illinois 2004
V. Sgarbi - S. Casanova "La tempera all’uovo di Donizetti"- OGGI, n. 21 2005
ENCICLOPEDIA TEMATICA – Nuova Enciclopedia Universale Rizzoli Larousse ARTE 2005
"Marquis WHO’S WHO" in the WORLD 2005 - 2006
"WHO’S WHO in ITALY" Sutter's International Red Series 2007
MARQUIS "Who’s Who in the WORLD" Illinois USA
"WHO’S WHO in ITALY" Sutter's International Golden Edition 2008
"Who’s Who in the World" ILLINOIS USA 2008
Roberta Scorranese "La modella ideale" CORRIERE della SERA 2008
"Marquis WHO’S WHO" in the WORLD 2009
"Marquis WHO’S WHO" in AMERICA 2009
NATIONAL PORTRAIT GALLERY – SMITHSONIAN INSTITUTION – WASHINGTON
MUSEO TESORO BASILICA SAN PIETRO IN VATICANO
MUSEO STORICA BASILICA PONTIDA
CIVICO MUSEO DI UDINE
MUSEO TEATRALE ALLA SCALA MILANO
GAMEC – GALLERIA DI ARTE MODERNA E CONTEMPORANEA BERGAMO

References

External links
 Official Site Official Site
 www.arsmedia.net Mario Donizetti's pages on www.arsmedia.net

20th-century Italian painters
20th-century Italian male artists
Italian male painters
21st-century Italian painters
Painters from Bergamo
Living people
1932 births
Italian male writers
Italian art critics
Italian contemporary artists
21st-century Italian male artists